Minotaur II rockets consist of the M55A1 first stage and SR19AJ1 second stage of a decommissioned Minuteman missile. The third stage varies depending on the configuration required for the payload: a Minuteman II M57A1 stage is used on the baseline configuration, whilst the Minotaur II+ uses an SR-73-AJ. The Minotaur II Lite is a two-stage configuration, without a third stage. A heavy configuration is also available, with an Orion 50XL third stage, as used on the Minotaur I. The baseline configuration can propel a  payload  downrange, whilst the heavy configuration can place  onto a  trajectory.

Nine Minotaur II rockets have been launched as of July 2022, with six flights using the baseline configuration and three using the Minotaur II+ configuration. Launches are conducted from Launch Facility 06 (LF-06) and Test Pad 01 (TP-01).

Launch history

Notes

References 

Minotaur (rocket family)